Ko Hyon-suk (born 21 March 1985) is a speed skater who competed for North Korea at the 2010 Winter Olympics as well as at the 2007 and 2011 Asian Winter Games.

References 

1985 births
North Korean female speed skaters
Speed skaters at the 2010 Winter Olympics
Speed skaters at the 2007 Asian Winter Games
Speed skaters at the 2011 Asian Winter Games
Olympic speed skaters of North Korea
Living people